Shrieker may refer to:

Fictional animals
Shrieker (Dungeons & Dragons), a fictional creature which appears in the Dungeons & Dragons role-playing games
Shrieker (Tremors), a fictional prehistoric creature in the Tremors series
A fictional creature found in Metroid Prime 2: Echoes

Other uses
Shrieker (film), 1998 horror film

See also
Shriek (disambiguation)